Cassadaga Lakes are located north of Cassadaga, New York. The lake chain consists of Upper Cassadaga Lake, Middle Cassadaga Lake, and Lower Cassadaga Lake. Fish species present in the lakes are largemouth bass, northern pike, smallmouth bass, pumpkinseed sunfish, bluegill, tiger muskie, muskellunge, black crappie, yellow perch, and black bullhead. There is a state owned boat launch located on Middle Cassadaga off Glasgow Road.

References 

Lakes of Chautauqua County, New York
Lakes of New York (state)